Kelsey Elizabeth Griswold, is an American pageant titleholder from Tulsa, Oklahoma who was named Miss Oklahoma 2013.

Biography
She won the title of Miss Oklahoma on June 8, 2013, when she received her crown from outgoing titleholder Alicia Clifton. Griswold's platform is promoting self-worth and acceptance among children during her year as Miss Oklahoma. Her competition talent was a vocal rendition of “Everybody Says Don't.” Kelsey was the second runner up to Miss America in 2014 and won the Swimsuit segment. Griswold is an honors graduate of Union High School (Tulsa, Oklahoma,); Graduate-BFA (cum laude), Oklahoma City University. Griswold also studied Shakespeare and classical acting, and stage combat (with an emphasis on fencing) at Kingston University in London. In 2015 she made her television acting debut in an episode of  Sex & Drugs & Rock & Roll on TNT.

References

External links

 

Miss America 2014 delegates
1992 births
Living people
People from Tulsa, Oklahoma
Oklahoma City University alumni
American beauty pageant winners
Miss America Preliminary Swimsuit winners